The China Railways SL8 (勝利8, Shènglì, "victory") class steam locomotive was a class of 4-6-2 express passenger steam locomotives operated by the China Railway. They were originally built for the South Manchuria Railway (Mantetsu) and the Manchukuo National Railway between 1937 and 1940.

History

The Pashiha class locomotives were designed as a replacement for the Pashiko class on high-speed passenger trains. The most advanced steam locomotives in Manchuria, they had a semi-streamlined body, and used SKF roller bearings on all axles of both the locomotive and the tender, which improved both operational efficiency and ease of maintenance. They also had a combustion chamber firebox, a Schmidt type E superheater, a feedwater heater and an automatic stoker.

Initially used for pulling trains such as the "Hato" express between Dalian and Xinjing, they were later used to haul long-distance passenger trains between Xinjing and Andong on the Andong Line after its track was doubled. One unit was built for the Manchukuo National Railway for use with Emperor Puyi's train. The first six were built for Mantetsu by Hitachi in Japan in 1937, which were followed by another ten of an improved design from the Shahekou Works in 1940. Shahekou also built the single unit for the Manchukuo National in 1940.

Originally numbered パシハ811–パシハ816, they were renumbered パシナ1–パシナ6 in Mantetsu's 1938 general renumbering, and subsequent units were numbered in this sequence.

Postwar
At the end of the Second Sino-Japanese War, the sixteen Mantetsu locomotives were assigned to the Dalian depot, while the Manchukuo National's single engine was assigned to the Fengtian Railway Bureau; all seventeen were passed on to the Republic of China Railway. After the establishment of the People's Republic and the current China Railway, they were designated class ㄆㄒ八 (PX8) in 1951, becoming class SL8 (勝利, Shènglì, "victory") in 1959; they were numbered 801 through 817. One SL8 was dedicated to pulling Mao Zedong's train. Five are known to have still been in service around 1980, around Beijing and Zhengzhou. SL8 815 is preserved at the Shenyang Steam Locomotive Museum.

References

4-6-2 locomotives
CRRC Dalian locomotives
Hitachi locomotives
Railway locomotives introduced in 1937
Steam locomotives of China
Standard gauge locomotives of China
Rolling stock of Manchukuo
Streamlined steam locomotives 
Passenger locomotives